Louis Galloche (24 August 1670 – 21 July 1761) was a French painter. A student of Louis de Boullogne, his own students included François Lemoyne, Charles-Joseph Natoire and François Boucher.

Life
He was born in Paris, the son of Charles Galloche and Jeanne Martinet.  He studied at the Lycée Louis-le-Grand.  Originally destined for the church, he soon found he had no vocation and began the study of philosophy.

Bibliography 
 François Marandet, "Louis Galloche et Fançois Lemoyne: caractères distinctifs et œuvres inédites", La Revue des Musée de France. Revue du Louvre, 2-2007, p. 29-36.

Sources 
 Louis Gougenot, Mémoires inédits sur les membres de l'Académie royale de peinture et de sculpture, Paris, J.-B. Dumoulin, 1854, p. 289-302.

1670 births
1761 deaths
17th-century French painters
French male painters
18th-century French painters
18th-century French male artists